Barood is a Bollywood masala film directed by Pramod Chakravorty released on 7 August 1998. In 1976, producer also  directed the movie of the same name. It stars Akshay Kumar and Raveena Tandon as the lead protagonists. Amrish Puri, Mohan Joshi, Rakhi Gulzar and Mohnish Behl played supporting roles in the film.

Plot 

Honest and diligent Police Inspector Jai Sharma suspects Mr. Singhal of being a hardcore criminal don, but is unable to apprehend him due to pressure from his superior officer, Police Commissioner Kalinath Gaur. Singhal's only daughter, Neha, is in love with Jai, and this news enrages Singhal as he wants her to marry Sanjay Gaur, the only son of the Commissioner, and he will not rest until he gets Jai killed, and will utilize every possible and available resource and influence to do this, which also includes exposing Gayetri's (Jai's mom) questionable past.

Cast
 Akshay Kumar as Jay Sharma
 Raveena Tandon as Neha Singhal
 Mohnish Behl as Sanjay Gaur
 Amrish Puri as Mr. Sumit Singhal
 Raakhee Gulzar as Gayatri Sharma
 Aruna Irani as Tara Khandelwal
 Gulshan Grover as Velji Chheda
 Mohan Joshi as Police Commissioner Kalinath Gaur
 Arjun as Jaggu
 Deepak Parashar as Shiv Sharma
 Ayesha Jhulka as Dancer / Singer

Soundtrack

References

External links 
 

1998 films
1990s masala films
1990s Hindi-language films
Films scored by Anand–Milind
Films directed by Pramod Chakravorty
Indian action drama films